Shanklin Pier Ltd v Detel Products Ltd [1951] 2 KB 854 is a leading judgment on the subject of collateral contracts in English contract law. In it the High Court of Justice King's Bench Division used the principle of collateral contracts, to create an exception to the rule of privity of contract where a contract may be given consideration by entering into another contract.

Facts
Shanklin Pier Ltd hired a contractor to paint Shanklin Pier. They spoke to Detel Products Ltd about whether a particular paint was suitable to be used, and Detel assured them that it was, and that it would last for at least seven years. On the basis of this conversation Shanklin Pier Ltd instructed the contractors to use a particular paint, which they did. The paint started to peel after three months, and Shanklin Pier attempted to claim compensation from Detel Products.

Judgment
McNair J's judgment read:

See also
Privity in English law

Notes

References

English contract case law
English privity case law
High Court of Justice cases
1951 in British law
1951 in case law